Yakiv Stepanovych Stepovy (October 20, 1883 – November 4, 1921) was a Ukrainian composer, music teacher, and music critic.

Stepovy was born Yakiv Yakymenko (Akimenko) in Kharkiv, in the Russian Empire (in present-day Ukraine). Stepovy's older brother), was also a composer. Stepovy was a representative of the Ukrainian musical intelligentsia of the 20th century. He was one of the founders of the national school of composition and composed in the tradition of Mykola Lysenko.

Stepovy was a graduate of the Saint Petersburg Conservatory, where he studied with Alexander Glazunov and Nikolai Rimsky-Korsakov and graduated in 1914.

During World War I, Stepovy was recruited to the military, where he worked as a secretary on a hospital train. He served in the military for almost three years, until he managed to get released in April 1917. After this he settled in Kyiv where he worked as a teacher at the Kyiv Conservatory and a musical critic.

He was a master at choral and piano works, the author of music collections for children, teacher of the Kyiv Conservatory and founder of the State vocal quartet.

See also
List of Ukrainian composers – see other Ukrainian composers of the same period

References

External links

Stepovy, Yakiv - biography, creativity, sheet music

1883 births
1921 deaths
Burials at Baikove Cemetery
Saint Petersburg Conservatory alumni
Academic staff of Kyiv Conservatory
Ukrainian classical composers
Ukrainian music educators